This is a list of Illyrian rulers (kings and queens) from the Enchelean and Taulantian kingdoms (dynasty):

 Galaurus: king of Taulantii. Unsuccessfully invaded Macedonia between 678–640 BC.
 Grabos I (5th century BC): attested on an Athenian inscription, he was very likely a person with great political responsibilities. He probably was the grandfather of Grabos II.
 Sirras (437–390 BC), ruler in Lyncestis.
 Grabos II (r. 358–356 BC): entered Athenian alliance to resist Philip's power in 356 BC.
 Pleuratus I (r. 356–335 BC): reigned near the Adriatic coast in southern Illyria. In a losing effort in 344 BC, tried to thwart Philip's advances in Illyria.
 Pleurias (r. c. 337/336 BC): Illyrian ruler who campaigned against Philip II about 337 BC. He is considered by some scholars as king of either the Autariatae, the Taulantii, or the Dardani. Some have suggested that he was the same as Pleuratus I; Pleurias is mentioned only in Diodorus (16.93.6), elsewhere unattested  in ancient sources.
 Cleitus, son of Bardylis I (r. 335–295 BC): mastermind behind the Illyrian Revolt in Pelion of 335 BC against Alexander the Great.
 Glaucias: king of Taulantii. He aided Cleitus at the Battle of Pelion in 335 BC, raised Pyrrhus of Epirus and was involved in other events in southern Illyria in the late 4th century BC.
 Beroea of Taulantii was an Illyrian queen, and wife of Glaukias, king of the Taulantii. She came from the ruling Molossian Aeacidae dynasty of Epirus. She raised Pyrrhus of Epirus when he was adopted by Glaukias.
 Monunius I, (r. 290–270 BC): reigned during the Gallic invasions of 279 BC. He minted his own silver staters in Dyrrhachion.
 Mytilos, successor of Monunius I and probably his son (r. 270–?): waged war on Epirus in 270 BC. He minted his own bronze coins in Dyrrhachion.

See also 
 Enchele
 Taulantii
 Illyrian kingdom
 Ardiaean-Labeatan dynasty

References

Works cited

Illyrian people
Illyrian royalty